Fundo Tehuén Airport (formerly Frutillar West Airport),  is an airstrip  northwest of Frutillar, a town in the Los Lagos Region of Chile.

Runway boundaries are not marked.

See also

Transport in Chile
List of airports in Chile

References

External links
OpenStreetMap - Fundo Tehuén
OurAirports - Fundo Tehuén
FallingRain - Fundo Tehuén Airport

Airports in Los Lagos Region